Monica Michel (born 16 April 1955) is a French politician of La République En Marche! (LREM) who served as the member of the National Assembly from 2017 to 2022, representing the 16th district of Bouches-du-Rhône.

Early life and career
Born in the Seychelles in 1955, Michel lived on Réunion, in Paris and Marseille before settling in Arles. In the early 2000s, she began working for Marseille-Fos Port where she held the position of commercial director for 18 years.

Political career
Michel joined LREM in 2017.

In parliament, Michel served on the Defence Committee. In addition to her committee assignments, she was a member of the French-Australian Parliamentary Friendship Group and the French-Indian Parliamentary Friendship Group.

In late 2019, Michel was one of 17 members of the committee who co-signed a letter to Prime Minister Édouard Philippe in which they warned that the 365 million euro ($406 million) sale of aerospace firm Groupe Latécoère to U.S. fund Searchlight Capital raised “questions about the preservation of know-how and France’s defence industry base” and urged government intervention.

In 2020, Michel joined En commun (EC), a group within LREM led by Barbara Pompili.

References

1955 births
Living people
People from Greater Victoria, Seychelles
French people of Seychellois descent
Black French politicians
La République En Marche! politicians
Territories of Progress politicians
Deputies of the 15th National Assembly of the French Fifth Republic
Members of Parliament for Bouches-du-Rhône
Women members of the National Assembly (France)
21st-century French women politicians